Kjell Stormoen (24 March 1921 – 22 October 2010) was a Norwegian actor, scenographer and theatre director.

He was born in Bergen as a son of Trygve H. Stormoen (1896–1971) and Hjørdis Henriksen (1897–1975). He was a first cousin of Guri Stormoen, and also related to Harald and Hans Stormoen. He was married twice, the first time to actor Elna Kimmestad from 1945 to 1972.

He was educated as an engraver, but also participated in the dramatic society Bergens Dramatiske Klubb. He was a scenographer at the Trøndelag Teater from 1945 to 1948. After some time as a scenographer at the newly opened Riksteatret in 1949, he became an actor at Rogaland Teater in the same year. He was theatre director at Rogaland Teater from 1951 to 1952, and worked as an actor at Riksteatret from 1952 to 1953, at Den Nationale Scene from 1953 to 1969 and at Nationaltheatret from 1969 to 1973. He was director at Trøndelag Teater from 1973 to 1979, and again actor at Nationaltheatret from 1980 to 1986. As a film actor he participated in more than twenty movies, including Kimen (1974), Streik! (1975) and Eggs (1995). His role in Eggs earned him the Amanda Award (shared with Sverre Hansen). In 2003 he was made an honorary member of the Norwegian Actors' Equity Association.

References

1921 births
2010 deaths
20th-century engravers
Norwegian engravers
Norwegian theatre directors
Norwegian male stage actors
Actors from Bergen
Norwegian male film actors
Theatre people from Bergen